The Twike (a portmanteau of the words twin and bike) is a human-electric hybrid vehicle (HEHV) designed to carry two passengers and cargo. Essentially a velomobile with an electrical hybrid engine, it can be driven in electric-only mode or electric + pedal power mode. Pedaling warms the user, making electric heating in winter unnecessary, extends the range of the vehicle but does not substantially add to the vehicle's top speed.

Constructed of lightweight materials such as aluminium (frame) and plastic (shell), the 246 kg (542 lb) (unladen, varying with battery weight) tricycle first used NiCd batteries, later Li-Mn, LiFePO4 and LiIon. Typically ranges reach from 50 to over 500 km depending on battery size, type, status on one side and speed and altitude profile and load on the other. Energy is reclaimed while driving through regenerative braking, and load is removed from the electric system by use of the pedalling system which transfers its input directly to the drivetrain (i.e., both systems operate in parallel, not in series).

The Twike is a three-wheeled two seater. The two rear wheels are direct-driven via a differential gear by one motor – and optionally additionally by 2 pairs of pedals in the case of the model "active". Twike is steered by joystick – for the right hand of the left-side seated pilot – via cables and has pedal brakes. The vehicle can reach speeds of up to 85 kilometers per hour (53 mph), using 7.4 kWh per 100 km. At 50 km/h it can drive up to 80 km.

History

The Twike I was developed for the 1986 World EXPO in Vancouver, Canada, by a group of Swiss students. It won the "Functionality Award" for the best ergonomic design in the Innovative Vehicle Design Competition (IVDC) and a first prize in the International Human Powered Vehicle Speed Championship . The Twike I was completely driven by human power.

Inspired by the success of the Twike I, a group of enthusiasts including Ralph Schnyder and Peter Zeller began to develop the Twike II as a step towards a vehicle for everyday road use. It was developed in cooperation with Alusuisse-Lonza Holding, was shown on the HEUREKA exhibition in Zürich, and took part in the 1991 Tour de Sol Alpin. The Twike II had a belt pedal drive with infinitely variable mechanical transmission and a DC motor powered by NiCd batteries to help propel the vehicle. The suitability for everyday use turned out to be significantly improved.

In 1992, the newly founded Twike Ltd. decided to develop the Twike II into a production vehicle and began looking for capital and customers. Production of the Twike III began in 1995 and during 1996 the reformed Twike AG produced and sold 190 vehicles, mostly in Switzerland and Germany. The Twike III was already equipped with an asynchronous AC motor and 336V NiCd batteries, the system still in use today. The pedal drive was simplified to a 5-speed hub gear and was included in all but very few special order vehicles.

In 1998, FINE Mobile GmbH launched its German Twike production line and finally became the exclusive producer of the Twike after taking over the rights of the SwissLEM AG in 2002.
Today the Twike is produced in Rosenthal, a small village in Hessen near Marburg. Pricing for a Twike starts at about €33.000 (as of 2021 per the website). By 2011, 900 were claimed to have been sold.

2010, team TW4XP took part at the Automotive X Prize in the US with their Twike-based TW4XP human-electric hybrid vehicle (Twike 4).

See also

 Cycle rickshaw
 List of motorized trikes
 Sinclair C5 – another three-wheeled pedal/battery vehicle
 Velomobile

References

External links
Official website

Electric vehicle industry
Electric three-wheel vehicles
Hybrid electric vehicles
1986 introductions